Ehmcke is a surname. Notable people with the surname include:

Franziska Ehmcke (born 1947), German professor of Japanese Studies
Fritz Helmuth Ehmcke (1878–1965), German graphic designer, typographer, and illustrator
Jaana Ehmcke (born 1987), German swimmer